Pagode is a type of Brazilian country-folk traditional style of music. It is also known as Cipó Preto (black liana), Pagode caipira (rural pagode) or Pagode sertanejo (folk pagode). Sertanejo means anything that comes from the back-country, outback or simply the countryside. This style of music was pioneered by musicians Tião Carreiro and Lourival dos Santos in the late 1950s, when they fused the "Coco" and "Calango de roda" rhythms. Although other instruments can be added, it is much characterized by its simple, acoustic approach, with the use of just one or two viola guitars, often accompanied by an acoustic guitar and, at times, a light percussion section. A structural feature commonly used in this genre is the alternation of verses sung with the accompaniment of a classical guitar, with solos of viola caipira. Pieces can be entirely instrumental or have one or two singers, usually: when there are two lead vocals (that can be men, women or a combination), they sing together on a steady interval. The metrics used are usually of five or seven-syllable roundels, and in presentations, songs quite often are linked together, on a medley. Another notable feature are its lyrics, that tend to portray the everyday life of country people, telling stories about simple life, nature, love, booze, animals and so on.

See also
Viola guitar

References

Brazilian music